This is a list of rules of inference, logical laws that relate to mathematical formulae.

Introduction

Rules of inference are syntactical transform rules which one can use to infer a conclusion from a premise to create an argument.  A set of rules can be used to infer any valid conclusion if it is complete, while never inferring an invalid conclusion, if it is sound. A sound and complete set of rules need not include every rule in the following list, as many of the rules are redundant, and can be proven with the other rules.

Discharge rules permit inference from a subderivation based on a temporary assumption.  Below, the notation

 

Rules for classical sentential calculus
Sentential calculus is also known as propositional calculus.

Rules for negations
Reductio ad absurdum (or Negation Introduction)
 
 
 

Reductio ad absurdum (related to the law of excluded middle)
 
 
 

Ex contradictione quodlibet
 
 
 

Double negation elimination
 
 

Double negation introduction

Rules for conditionals
Deduction theorem (or Conditional Introduction)
 
 

Modus ponens (or Conditional Elimination)
 
 
 

Modus tollens

Rules for conjunctions
Adjunction (or Conjunction Introduction)

 
 
 

Simplification (or Conjunction Elimination)

Rules for disjunctions
Addition (or Disjunction Introduction)
 
 

 
 

Case analysis (or Proof by Cases or Argument by Cases or Disjunction elimination)
 
 
 
 

Disjunctive syllogism
 
 
 

 
 
 

Constructive dilemma

Rules for biconditionals

Biconditional introduction
 
 
 

Biconditional elimination

Rules of classical predicate calculus

In the following rules,  is exactly like  except for having the term  wherever  has the free variable .

Universal Generalization (or Universal Introduction)
 
 

Restriction 2:   is not mentioned in any hypothesis or undischarged assumptions.

Universal Instantiation (or Universal Elimination)
 
 

Existential Generalization (or Existential Introduction)
 
 

 
Existential Instantiation (or Existential Elimination)
 
 
 

Restriction 3:   is not mentioned in any hypothesis or undischarged assumptions.

Rules of substructural logic
The following are special cases of universal generalization and existential elimination; these occur in substructural logics, such as linear logic.
 
Rule of weakening (or monotonicity of entailment) (aka no-cloning theorem)

 
 

Rule of contraction (or idempotency of entailment) (aka no-deleting theorem)

Table: Rules of Inference 
The rules above can be summed up in the following table. The "Tautology" column shows how to interpret the notation of a given rule.

All rules use the basic logic operators. A complete table of "logic operators" is shown by a truth table, giving definitions of all the possible (16) truth functions of 2 boolean variables (p, q):

where T = true and F = false, and, the columns are the logical operators: 

 0, false, Contradiction; 
 1, NOR, Logical NOR (Peirce's arrow); 
 2, Converse nonimplication; 
 3, ¬p, Negation; 
 4, Material nonimplication; 
 5, ¬q, Negation; 
 6, XOR, Exclusive disjunction; 
 7, NAND, Logical NAND (Sheffer stroke); 
 8, AND, Logical conjunction; 
 9, XNOR, If and only if, Logical biconditional; 
 10, q, Projection function; 
 11, if/then, Logical implication; 
 12, p, Projection function; 
 13, then/if, Converse implication; 
 14, OR, Logical disjunction; 
 15, true, Tautology.

Each logic operator can be used in an assertion about variables and operations, showing a basic rule of inference. Examples:
 The column-14 operator (OR), shows Addition rule: when p=T (the hypothesis selects the first two lines of the table), we see (at column-14) that p∨q=T.
 We can see also that, with the same premise, another conclusions are valid: columns 12, 14 and 15 are T.
 The column-8 operator (AND), shows Simplification rule: when p∧q=T (first line of the table), we see that p=T.
 With this premise, we also conclude that q=T, p∨q=T, etc. as shown by columns 9–15.
 The column-11 operator (IF/THEN), shows Modus ponens rule: when p→q=T and p=T only one line of the truth table (the first) satisfies these two conditions. On this line, q is also true. Therefore, whenever p → q is true and p is true, q must also be true.
Machines and well-trained people use this look at table approach to do basic inferences, and to check if other inferences (for the same premises) can be obtained.

Example 1 
Consider the following assumptions: "If it rains today, then we will not go on a canoe today. If we do not go on a canoe trip today, then we will go on a canoe trip tomorrow. Therefore (Mathematical symbol for "therefore" is ), if it rains today, we will go on a canoe trip tomorrow".
To make use of the rules of inference in the above table we let  be the proposition "If it rains today",  be "We will not go on a canoe today" and let  be "We will go on a canoe trip tomorrow". Then this argument is of the form:

Example 2 
Consider a more complex set of assumptions: "It is not sunny today and it is colder than yesterday". "We will go swimming only if it is sunny", "If we do not go swimming, then we will have a barbecue", and "If we will have a barbecue, then we will be home by sunset" lead to the conclusion "We will be home by sunset."
Proof by rules of inference: Let  be the proposition "It is sunny today",  the proposition "It is colder than yesterday",  the proposition "We will go swimming",  the proposition "We will have a barbecue", and  the proposition "We will be home by sunset". Using our intuition we conjecture that the conclusion might be . Using the Rules of Inference table we can prove the conjecture easily:

See also

List of logic systems

Modus ponendo tollens

References

Mathematics-related lists
Logic-related lists

de:Schlussregel
he:חוקי היקש